The 2010 Brabantse Pijl was the 50th edition of the Brabantse Pijl cycle race and was held on 14 April 2010. The race started in Leuven and finished in Overijse. The race was won by Sébastien Rosseler.

General classification

References

2010
Brabantse Pijl